Mookaneri Lake, also called Kannankurichi Lake, is a lake in Kannankurichi, in the Salem taluk of the Indian state of Tamil Nadu, that covers an area of . It is located to the south of the Shevaroy Hills and is a major water body in Salem. The lake is fed by rainfall from the surrounding area, including the hills surrounding Yercaud, which flows into the lake via the Puthu Yeri and Kothukaran Odai streams.

There are 47 man-made islands in the lake. Each island was created by excavating and piling lakebed clay about 10 feet high, and covers and aea of a few thousand square feet. Initially, millet was planted on the islands to arrest erosion and help build a soil layer, bfore saplings of neem, banyan, jambul, peepal, and vetiver trees could be planted. The lake islands were populated by nearly 12,000 trees as of 2013.

Restoration
The Mookaneri Lake in Salem was dying from sewage and garbage. Salem Citizen's Forum, a collective of urban citizens resurrected the lake at an outlay of Rs. 87 lakh under the public initiative. The Forum began work at Mookaneri in 2010 May after many pleas to the district administration failed to evoke a response.

Fauna

Mookaneri lake is a popular bird watching destination. The floating islands in the lake area with lush growth of trees helps in providing shelter for the birds, like a birds’ sanctum, and their food needs are sufficed by the waterhole or lake. The most commonly sighted birds are egrets and kingfishers. Over 169 species of birds have been spotted in the lake. The Pink-feathered Flamingos are magnificent to watch.  Apart from this Garganey, Northern pintail, Grey Wagtail, Common sandpiper, Rosy starling, Whiskered tern, Baillon's crake, Yellow bittern, Paddyfield warbler, Citrine wagtail, Streak-throated swallow, Brown-headed gull, Painted stork, Oriental darter and Black-headed gull are the migratory birds sighted in the lake. Bird watchers and naturalists in the city want to obtain sanctuary status for the lake.

Fishing

The lake was a source of groundwater recharge for the surrounding areas. the lake has a few varieties of fish, such as rohu, catla kendai and kuruvai. Fishing is carried out by local fishermen and enthusiasts. The coracles of the fishermen are a part of the beautiful lake.

Facilities
The park has a children's play area and mini auditorium set up in a natural environment, seating arrangements, flower pants on the bunds and walker's path along the lake. Coracles available to visit islands of lake.

Environmental concerns
During Vinayaka Chaturthi every year there is a rampant pollution and damage caused to Mookaneri by the various organisations by immersing the idols.

Gallery

See also

 Yercaud, Tamil Nadu
 Shevaroy Hills, Tamil Nadu
 Salem, Tamil Nadu

References

Lakes of Tamil Nadu
Salem, Tamil Nadu
Tourist attractions in Salem district